Saračević is a surname. Notable people with the surname include:

Hajrudin Saračević (born 1949), Bosnian football player
Jovan Saračević (1902–1973), Bishop of the Russian Orthodox Church Outside of Russia and vicar of the Canadian diocese 
Muhammed Cham Saračević (born 2000), Austrian footballer 
Zlatan Saračević (born 1956), Bosnian shot putter
Zlatko Saračević (1961–2021), Croatian handball player

Bosnian surnames
Croatian surnames
Serbian surnames